These are the official results of the 2016 Mediterranean Athletics U23 Championships which took place on 14–15 June 2014 in Tunis, Tunisia.

Men's results

100 metres

200 metres
Heats

FinalWind: +1.7 m/s

400 metres

800 metres

1500 metres

5000 metres

10000 metres

References

Mediterrananea
Events at the Mediterranean Athletics U23 Championships